The 2002 Categoría Primera A season was the 54th season of Colombia's top-flight football league.

Format 
Starting from this year, the General Assembly of DIMAYOR approved the expansion of the tournament from 16 to 18 teams, adding to the league two of the three DIMAYOR "A-class" associates who were taking part of the Categoría Primera B at the time through a special promotion tournament. In addition to this, the league started awarding two championships per season, thus making the Apertura and Finalización tournaments independent championships within a single season.

For both the Apertura and Finalización tournaments, the 18 teams were first divided into three groups of six teams, playing five games, and then all teams in the league played each other once for a total of 22 matches. The semifinal round was played by the best eight teams at the end of the 22 matches, who were divided into two groups of four teams each according to their position at the end of the first stage: odd-ranked teams made up Group A, while even-ranked ones made up Group B. The winners of each group played the finals to decide the champions of each tournament.

Torneo Apertura 
The Torneo Apertura (officially the 2002 Copa Mustang I for sponsorship reasons) was the first tournament of the season. The tournament began on 3 February and ended on 19 June.

First stage

Standings

Semifinals

Group A 
Standings

Results

Group B 
Standings

Results

Finals

Top goalscorers

Torneo Finalización 
The Torneo Finalización (officially the 2002 Copa Mustang II for sponsorship reasons) was the second tournament of the season. It began on 7 July and ended on 22 December.

First stage

Standings

Semifinals

Group A 
Standings

Results

Group B 
Standings

Results

Finals

Top goalscorers

Aggregate table 
An aggregate table including all games that a team played during the year was used to determine berths to both the Copa Libertadores and the Copa Sudamericana. The best-placed non-champion qualified for the 2003 Copa Libertadores along with both champions of the season, while the second and third best-placed non-champions qualified for the 2003 Copa Sudamericana.

Relegation 

Rules for classification: 1st average; 2nd wins; 3rd goal difference; 4th number of goals scored; 5th away goals scored.

References

External links 
 Dimayor official website
 Colombia 2002 RSSSF

Categoría Primera A seasons
1
Col